Filipinos in the Maldives consist mainly of expatriates and migrant workers from the Philippines. As of 2018, there were about 3,000 overseas Filipinos working in the Maldives. The Philippine Embassy in Bangladesh has a jurisdiction over  the Maldives.

Labor issues
About 60 Filipino construction workers in Maldives sought immediate repatriation, alleging unjust working conditions including the non-payment of wages and the lack of substantial food and potable water.

They were often only provided porridge for breakfast and as for the rest of their meals, they had to rely on their own catch of fish and they also have to collect rain water for their own drinking water. Many of them had to find part-time jobs so they can purchase food and personal things such as soap and medicines.

See also
 Filipinos in India

References

Ethnic groups in the Maldives
Maldives
Maldives
Demographics of the Maldives